Dead Lucky is a four-part Australian crime thriller drama series, written and created by Ellie Beaumont and Drew Proffitt, that broadcast on SBS from 25 July 2018. The series, produced by Subtext Pictures and  directed by David Caesar, follows Grace Gibbs (Rachel Griffiths), a detective obsessed with catching an armed robber who murdered one of her junior officers; her new trainee, Charlie (Yoson An), blames for the death of his best friend. The story encompasses a share-house of international students, a pair of corrupt shop owners, a grieving widow, and a gunman, who all collide, leaving one dead and another missing.

The series is one of three commissions made by SBS in 2017, alongside fellow crime thrillers Sunshine and Safe Harbour. The series was acquired by AMC Networks for premium subscription streaming service SundanceNow, which will screen the series in the United States, Canada, the United Kingdom, Ireland and German-speaking territories in Europe. In the United States, the series premiered in full on 20 September 2018.

Cast

 Rachel Griffiths as DS Grace Gibbs
 Yoson An as Charlie Fung
 Mojean Aria as Mani Dalir
 Ian Meadows as Corey Baxter
 Rhys Muldoon as Richard
 Anna Samson as Anna Jamison
 Xana Tang as Bo-Lin
 Matt Nable as Matt O’Reilly
 Sara West as Leah Baxter
 Aldo Mignone as Eduardo Torres
 Sarah Thamin as Mary Ho
 Tessa de Josselin as Jess Roberts
 Annie Maynard as Penny Weir
 Shameer Birges as Marco Varma
 Simon Burke as Tony Hodge
 Brooke Satchwell as Claire
 Karen Pang as Mrs. Fung
 Jon-Claire Lee as Mr. Fung
 Julia Savage as Edie O'Reilly
 Justine Clarke as Erica Hodge
 Natalie Saleeba as Imogen Lander
 Brad McMurray as Ivan Milski 
 Takhi Saul as Tommy Meeky
 Tony Cogin as Ian Jamison
 Susana Downes as Emily Tran
 Jude Hyland as Toby Diago
 Patrick Ryan as Paramedic

Episodes

Home media 

Umbrella Entertainment Released The Complete Series on DVD in April 2019.

References

External links
 

2010s Australian crime television series
2010s Australian drama television series
2010s crime drama television series
English-language television shows
Murder in television
Special Broadcasting Service original programming
Television shows set in Sydney
2018 Australian television series debuts
2018 Australian television series endings